The American Osteopathic Association's (AOA) Commission on Osteopathic College Accreditation (COCA) accredits medical schools granting the Doctor of Osteopathic Medicine (DO) degree in the United States. The US Department of Education lists the Commission as a recognized accreditor.

Accreditation standards
There are many requirements for the accreditation of a college of osteopathic medicine.  Accreditation requires that the college have a clearly defined mission, with resources to attain it, and evidence that successful achievement of the mission is likely.  Accreditation also requires that the college incorporate the science of medicine and osteopathic principles and practice into the curriculum. In order for a new school to open or for an established school to receive approval to grow in size, the school must also demonstrate that it has access to enough clerkship sites for the third and fourth year students. Standards also require training in internal medicine, obstetrics/gynecology, pediatrics, family practice, surgery, psychiatry, emergency medicine, radiology, preventive medicine and public health.

See also
List of recognized accreditation associations of higher learning

References

External links
Official website

School accreditors
Osteopathic medical schools in the United States
Osteopathic medicine